The Dnieper-Bug Sea Commercial Port is a seaport located in Ukraine on the left bank of the Bug estuary near the Rus' Spit, 10 miles south of the Mykolaiv Sea Commercial Port and 32 miles from the Black Sea.

See also

List of ports in Ukraine
Transport in Ukraine

References

Ports of Mykolaiv
Companies established in 1978
Buildings and structures in Mykolaiv Oblast